Leventritt may refer to:
Leventritt Competition, international competition for classical pianists and violinists
 Leventritt Silver Ribbon Pairs, seniors bridge competition named for Peter Leventritt
 David Leventritt (1845–1926), American lawyer and judge
 Peter Leventritt (1916–1998, Peter A.), American bridge player